The Versatiles were a Jamaican reggae group, formed in 1967 by Junior Byles, Louie Davis and Dudley Earl. In 1970 Byles left the group for a successful solo career.

See also
Crab Records

References

Jamaican reggae musical groups